Legislative elections will be held in Austria by 2024 to elect the 28th National Council, the lower house of Austria's bicameral parliament.

Background
The 2019 legislative election was called after the Ibiza affair, which triggered the collapse of the coalition government between the Austrian People's Party (ÖVP) and Freedom Party of Austria (FPÖ) led by Chancellor Sebastian Kurz. The coalition was ousted in a motion of no confidence and replaced by a non-partisan interim government. The election delivered a strong victory for the ÖVP, who rose to 37.5%, while the FPÖ declined to 16%, their worst result since 2006. With 21%, the opposition Social Democratic Party of Austria (SPÖ) recorded their worst performance in over a century. The Greens returned to the National Council after falling out in 2017, achieving their best-ever result with 14%. NEOS improved to 8%.

The ÖVP formed a coalition with The Greens, a first on the federal level in Austria. The new government took office in January 2020, with Sebastian Kurz returning as Chancellor.

Norbert Hofer announced his resignation as leader of the Freedom Party in June 2021. He was replaced by parliamentary group leader Herbert Kickl, whose dismissal as interior minister caused the collapse of the ÖVP–FPÖ government in 2019.

On 6 October 2021, agents of the Central Prosecutorial Agency for Corruption and Economic Affairs (WKStA) raided the Federal Chancellery and the headquarters of the ÖVP as part of a corruption probe targeting Chancellor Sebastian Kurz and his "inner circle". Prosecutors alleged that, in 2016, Kurz paid bribes to news outlets to publish coverage and opinion polling favourable to himself, the goal of the scheme being to undermine then-ÖVP leader Reinhold Mitterlehner so that Kurz could take his place. The Greens threatened to support a motion of no confidence if Kurz did not step down as Chancellor. He announced his resignation on 9 October and was replaced by foreign minister Alexander Schallenberg. However, he was quickly elected faction leader of the ÖVP in the National Council, and it was widely understood that he would remain de facto leader of the government.

On 2 December, Kurz announced he would resign from all offices and retire from politics, citing a desire to focus on his family after becoming a father. Shortly after, Schallenberg announced he would resign as Chancellor in favour of the new ÖVP leader once one had been elected. On 3 December, Interior Minister Karl Nehammer was unanimously appointed as leader of the ÖVP by the federal party committee and proposed as Chancellor. He was sworn in by President Alexander Van der Bellen on 6 December.

Electoral system
The 183 members of the National Council are elected by open list proportional representation at three levels; a single national constituency, nine constituencies based on the federal states, and 39 regional constituencies. Seats are apportioned to the regional constituencies based on the results of the most recent census. For parties to receive any representation in the National Council, they must either win at least one seat in a constituency directly, or clear a 4 percent national electoral threshold.

Following the elections, seats are allocated to the candidates of successful parties and lists in a three-stage process, starting with the regional constituencies. Seats are distributed according to the Hare quota in the regional constituencies, and with unallocated seats distributed at the state constituency level. Any remaining seats are then allocated using the D'Hondt method at the federal level, to ensure overall proportionality between a party's national vote share and its share of parliamentary seats.

In addition to voting for a political party, voters may cast three preferential votes for specific candidates of that party, but are not required to do so. These additional votes do not affect the proportional allocation based on the vote for the party or list, but can change the rank order of candidates on a party's lists at the federal, state, and regional level. The threshold to increase the position of a candidate on a federal party list is 7 percent, compared to 10 percent at the state level, and 14 percent at the regional level. The names of candidates on regional party lists are printed on the ballot and can be marked with an "x" to indicate the voter's preference. Preference votes for candidates on party lists at the state and federal level, however, must be written in by the voter, either by writing the name or the rank number of the candidate in a blank spot provided for that purpose.

Contesting parties 
The table below lists parties represented in the 27th National Council.

Opinion polls

References

Austria
Elections in Austria